Peri-urbanisation relates to the processes of scattered and dispersive urban growth that create hybrid landscapes of fragmented and mixed urban and rural characteristics.

Origin 
The expression originates from the French word  ("peri-urban" meaning "around urban"), which is used by the INSEE (the French statistics agency) to describe spaces—between the city and the countryside—that are shaped by the fragmented urbanisation of former rural areas in the urban fringe, both in a qualitative (e.g. diffusion of urban lifestyle) and in a quantitative (e.g. new residential zones) sense. It is frequently seen as a result of post-modernity. In science, the term was used initially in France and Switzerland.

Structure and function 

Peri-urban areas (also called rurban space, outskirts or the hinterland) are defined by the structure resulting from the process of peri-urbanisation. It can be described as the landscape interface between town and countryside, or also as the rural—urban transition zone where urban and rural uses and functions mix and often clash. It can thus be viewed as a new landscape type in its own right, one forged from an interaction of urban and rural land use.

Its definition shifts depending on the global location, but typically in Europe where suburban areas are intensively managed to prevent urban sprawl and protect agricultural land, the urban fringe will be characterised by certain land uses which have either purposely moved away from the urban area, or require much larger tracts of land. As examples:

 Roads, especially motorways and bypasses
 Waste transfer stations, recycling facilities and landfill sites
 Park and ride sites
 Airports
 Large hospitals
 Power, water and sewerage facilities
 Factories
 Large out-of-town shopping facilities, e.g. large supermarkets
 High-density residential buildings

Despite these urban uses, the fringe remains largely open with the majority of the land for agricultural, woodland or other rural uses. However, the quality of living of the countryside around urban areas tends to be low with severance between areas of open land and badly maintained woodlands and hedgerows with the scattered urban facilities.

Apart from the structural definition dominating English-speaking literature, the concept is sometimes used to fill the gap between suburbanisation and exurbanisation, and thus relates moreover to the movement of people in space. In this case however, peri-urbanisation is seen as the expansion of functional rural-urban linkages such as by commuting.

See also 
 Desakota
 FEDENATUR - European Association of Periurban Parks
 Peri Urban Regions Platform Europe
 Peri-urban agriculture
 Rural–urban fringe
 Urban sprawl
 Urban village
 Urban vitality

References

Further reading 
 
 
 Anne Lambert 2011: The (mis)measurement of periurbanization. In: Metropolitics, 11 May 2011. URL: http://www.metropolitiques.eu

Urbanization
Urban geography